The 2023 WNBA Draft, the WNBA's draft for the 2023 WNBA season, will be held in the spring of 2023 following the 2022–23 NCAA Division I women's basketball season. The draft will be the 28th in WNBA history. On February 23, 2023, it was announced that the 2023 draft would take place at Spring Studios New York on April 10, 2023. It will also be exclusively televised on ESPN.

Draft lottery
The lottery selection to determine the order of the top four picks in the 2023 draft took place on November 11, 2022, and was televised on ESPN leading into ESPN's women’s college basketball game that evening featuring defending National Champion South Carolina at Maryland. The four non-playoff teams in 2022 qualified from the lottery drawing: Indiana Fever, Atlanta Dream, Los Angeles Sparks, and the Minnesota Lynx. The Sparks made a trade in February 2022 that allowed their pick to ultimately end up with the Washington Mystics at the time of the drawing. Each team had a representative at the lottery drawing - Kelsey Mitchell for the Fever, Head Coach Tanisha Wright for the Dream, Natasha Cloud for the Mystics, and Napheesa Collier for the Lynx. The Fever won the lottery for the first time in franchise history and were awarded the top pick in the draft. The rest of the order went as the following: Lynx, Dream, and Mystics.

Lottery chances

The lottery odds were based on combined records from the 2021 and 2022 WNBA seasons. In the drawing, 14 balls numbered 1–14 are placed in a lottery machine and mixed. Four balls are drawn to determine a four-digit combination (only 11–12–13–14 is ignored and redrawn). The team to which that four-ball combination is assigned receives the No. 1 pick. The four balls are then placed back into the machine and the process is repeated to determine the second pick. The two teams whose numerical combinations do not come up in the lottery will select in the inverse order of their two-year cumulative record. Ernst & Young knows the discreet results before they are announced.

The order of selection for the remainder of the first round as well as the second and third rounds was determined by inverse order of the teams' respective regular-season records solely from 2022.

Eligibility
Under the current collective bargaining agreement (CBA) between the WNBA and its players' union, draft eligibility for players not defined as "international" requires the following to be true:
 The player's 22nd birthday falls during the calendar year of the draft. For this draft, the cutoff birth date is December 31, 2001.
 She has either:
 completed her college eligibility;
 received a bachelor's degree, or is scheduled to receive such in the 3 months following the draft; or
 is at least 4 years removed from high school graduation.

A player who is scheduled to receive her bachelor's degree within 3 months of the draft date, and is younger than the cutoff age, is only eligible if the calendar year of the draft is no earlier than the fourth after her high school graduation.

Players with remaining college eligibility who meet the cutoff age must notify the WNBA headquarters of their intent to enter the draft no later than 10 days before the draft date, and must renounce any remaining college eligibility to do so. A separate notification timetable is provided for players involved in postseason tournaments (most notably the NCAA Division I tournament); those players (normally) must declare for the draft within 24 hours of their final game.

"International players" are defined as those for whom all of the following is true:
 Born and currently residing outside the U.S.
 Never "exercised intercollegiate basketball eligibility" in the U.S.

For "international players", the eligibility age is 20, also measured on December 31 of the year of the draft.

Key

Draft

First round

Second round

Third round

Footnotes

References

Women's National Basketball Association Draft
WNBA draft
WNBA draft